Gold Vol. 2 is a French-language compilation album by Canadian singer Celine Dion, released in France by Versailles on 2 October 1995. It features fourteen rare songs recorded between 1983 and 1987, including the whole Incognito album. In France, it was certified Gold. Gold Vol. 2 was also released in Belgium reaching number fifty-one on the chart in Wallonia.

Background, content and commercial performance
After the success of D'eux, which became the best-selling French-language album of all time, Versailles issued Gold Vol. 2 on 2 October 1995, a second compilation (after Gold Vol. 1) of Dion's early and rare recordings from the '80s. It includes the whole 1987 album, Incognito. Gold Vol. 2 peaked at number fifty-one in Belgium Wallonia in May 1996 and was certified Gold in France in 1998 and sold 130,000 copies. In 1997, the album was re-released as Les premières chansons vol. 2.

Track listing

Charts

Certifications and sales

Release history

References

External links
 

1995 compilation albums
Albums produced by Aldo Nova
Albums produced by Eddy Marnay
Albums produced by Pierre Bazinet
Celine Dion compilation albums